Ismail Fazıl Pasha (1856 – 18 April 1921), the son of Mustafa Fazl Pasha was an Ottoman general. He was commander of the Ottoman Army, a politician, statesman of the Ottoman Empire and the government of the Grand National Assembly of Turkey. He married Zekiye Hatice Hanim, who was daughter of Mehmed Ali Pasha. They had two sons, Ali Fuat Cebesoy and Mehmet Ali Cebesoy.

Sources

External links
Tülay Ercoşkun, İsmail Fazıl Paşa'nın (Cebesoy) Islahata Dair Görüşleri, Ankara Üniversitesi Dil ve Tarih-Coğrafya Fakültesi Tarih Bölümü Tarih Araştırmaları Dergisi, XXVI. Cilt, 42. Sayı, Ankara, Eylül 2007, ss. 181–201.

1856 births
1948 deaths
Ottoman Military Academy alumni
Ottoman Military College alumni
Ottoman Army generals
Ottoman military personnel of the Balkan Wars
Ottoman military personnel of World War I
Turkish people of the Turkish War of Independence
Turkish Army generals
Government ministers of Turkey
Deputies of Yozgat
Muhammad Ali dynasty